Omalogyra fusca is a species of minute sea snail, a marine gastropod mollusc in the family Omalogyridae.

References
 Powell A. W. B., New Zealand Mollusca, William Collins Publishers Ltd, Auckland, New Zealand 1979 

Omalogyridae
Gastropods of New Zealand
Gastropods described in 1908